Brampton Gurdon (died 1648) was an English country gentleman and politician who sat in the House of Commons from 1621 to 1622.

Gurdon was the son of John Gurdon of Assington, Suffolk and his wife Amy Brampton, daughter of William Brampton of Letton, Norfolk. His father was MP for Sudbury and High Sheriff of Suffolk in 1585.

In 1621, Gurdon was elected Member of Parliament for Sudbury. He became Sheriff of Suffolk in 1629.

Gurdon married twice. His first wife was Elizabeth Barrett, daughter of Edward Barrett of Bellhouse, Essex, and they had sons John and Robert and a daughter Amy who married Sir Henry Mildmay of Graces. He married secondly Muriel Sedley, daughter of Sir Martyn Sedley of Morley Norfolk and they had a son Brampton and daughters Muriel who married Richard Saltonshall of Yorkshire, and Abigail who married Roger Hill of Somerset. He divided his estates between his two sons: John, who was MP for several constituencies during the Civil War period and a member of the Council of State succeeded to Assington, and Letton passed to Brampton who was a cavalry colonel on the Parliamentary side during the Civil War and later also MP for Sudbury.

There is a memorial to him in the church of St Edmund in Assington.

References

D Brunton & D H Pennington, Members of the Long Parliament (London: George Allen & Unwin, 1954)

1649 deaths
Year of birth missing
English MPs 1621–1622
High Sheriffs of Suffolk